Avraamovsky is a rural locality (a khutor) in Verkhnerechenskoye Rural Settlement, Nekhayevsky District, Volgograd Oblast, Russia. The population was 148 as of 2010.

Geography 
Avraamovsky is located on the bank of the Tishanka River, 11 km west of Nekhayevskaya (the district's administrative centre) by road. Markovsky is the nearest rural locality.

References 

Rural localities in Nekhayevsky District